William Joseph Joy (20 June 1863 – 1947) was an English footballer who played in the Football League for Blackburn Rovers, Darwen  and Preston North End.

References

1863 births
1947 deaths
English footballers
Association football goalkeepers
English Football League players
Preston North End F.C. players
Blackburn Rovers F.C. players
Darwen F.C. players